WORM (1010 AM, Savannah's Pure Gold Station) is a radio station broadcasting an oldies music format. Licensed to Savannah, Tennessee, United States, the station is currently owned by Gerald W. Hunt.

References

External links

FCC History Cards for WORM

Oldies radio stations in the United States
ORM
Hardin County, Tennessee